Andrew Moss (born 1 June 1985) is an English actor. He is known for portraying the role of Rhys Ashworth in the Channel 4 soap opera Hollyoaks from 2005 to 2014. He also appeared in the BBC soap opera Doctors as Paul Cuthbert. On stage, he played the role of Sam Wheat in the National tour of Ghost the Musical.

TV credits
Hollyoaks was Moss' first regular television role, though he had previously played Craig Gutteridge in the BBC drama series Cutting It, in addition to minor roles in Merseybeat, Doctors and two episodes of Coronation Street. In 2013 he starred in one episode of Casualty. Moss trained at the North Cheshire Theatre College, where he earned a Diploma in Drama.  He also attended Sheena SimonB College, where he also obtained a National Diploma in Musical Theatre. In 2016, he played the recurring role of Paul Cuthbert in Doctors.

References

External links
 

1984 births
Living people
English male television actors
Male actors from Manchester